Michał Bajor (born 13 June 1957 in Głuchołazy, Poland) is a Polish actor and musician. Bajor’s songs are based on texts by Wojciech Młynarski, Jonasz Kofta, Andrzej Ozga, Marcin Sosnowski, and Julian Tuwim. He is a member of the Academy of the Polish Society of the Phonographic Industry.

Selected filmography
 Alchemist (1988) as Prince Frederick
 Escape from the 'Liberty' Cinema (1990) as film critic
 Quo vadis (2001) as ancient Roman Emperor Nero

Discography

Studio albums

Live albums

Compilation albums

Christmas albums

References

External links 

 
 Official site

1957 births
Living people
Aleksander Zelwerowicz National Academy of Dramatic Art in Warsaw alumni
People from Głuchołazy
Polish male actors
Cabaret singers
20th-century Polish male singers
21st-century Polish male singers
21st-century Polish singers